Our Lady of the Rosa Mystica Church is a catholic church located in Lucas do Rio Verde, Brazil. The church was founded in 2014.

References

Churches in Mato Grosso
Lucas do Rio Verde